Tokyo 2nd district was a constituency of the House of Representatives in the Diet of Japan (national legislature). Between 1947 and 1993 it elected three, later five representatives by single non-transferable vote. It initially consisted of Shinagawa and Ōta in Eastern mainland Tokyo and, following their return from US military administration, Tokyo's Izu and Ogasawara islands. Since the election of 1996, the area forms the new single-member 3rd district.

Prominent representatives from the 2nd district included feminist pioneer Shizue Katō, her husband, labor activist Kanjū Katō, conservative environment and transport minister Shintarō Ishihara and DSP president Keigo Ōuchi.

Summary of results during the 1955 party system

Elected Representatives

Last election result 1993

References 

Districts of the House of Representatives (Japan)
Politics of Tokyo